Oedoparena glauca is a common coastal fly from the family Dryomyzidae. It is the only known dipterous predator of barnacles.

Distribution
This is a Nearctic fly occurring from Central California to Alaska.

Ecology
Eggs are deposited on the operculum of barnacle and fly larvae consume several barnacles during their development. Pupariation then takes place in an empty barnacle shell. The adult flies emerge during the morning low tide. It is possible that other members of the genus Oedoparena may have a similar lifestyle.

References

Dryomyzidae
Diptera of North America
Insects described in 1900